Türkmenbaşy District (Turkmen: Türkmenbaşy etraby)  is a district in Balkan Province, Turkmenistan. The administrative center of the district is the town of Türkmenbaşy şäherçesi.

Its name is derived from the title "Türkmenbaşy" (head Turkmen) former President of Turkmenistan Saparmurat Niyazov created for himself.

Education 
The Naval Institute of the Ministry of Defense of Turkmenistan, which provides higher education, is located on the territory of the etrap.

References

Districts of Turkmenistan
Balkan Region